James Henry Cassidy (October 28, 1869 – August 23, 1926) was a U.S. Representative from Ohio for one term from 1909 to 1911.

Biography 

Born in Cleveland, Ohio, Cassidy attended public schools. He later studied law at Cleveland Law School.

He was admitted to the bar in 1899 and commenced practice in Cleveland, Ohio. Cassidy subsequently served as clerk of the Committee on Rivers and Harbors, House of Representatives, from December 1901 until January 11, 1909, when he resigned.

James H. Cassidy was elected as a Republican to the Sixty-first Congress to fill the vacancy caused by the resignation of Theodore E. Burton, where he served from April 20, 1909 to March 3, 1911.
He was an unsuccessful candidate for reelection in 1910 to the Sixty-second Congress.
He resumed the practice of his profession in Cleveland, Ohio.
He was appointed as receiver of the Cleveland & Pittsburgh Coal Co..
He moved to New York in 1915 and engaged in the brokerage business.
He served as president of an express company.
He died in Forest Hills Gardens, New York on August 23, 1926.
He was interred in Maple Grove Cemetery (Kew Gardens, New York).

Sources

1869 births
1926 deaths
Republican Party members of the United States House of Representatives from Ohio
Lawyers from Cleveland
Cleveland–Marshall College of Law alumni
Politicians from Cleveland
19th-century American lawyers